Bristol is an unincorporated community and census-designated place (CDP) in Pierce County, Georgia, United States. Bristol is located at the intersection of the concurrent Georgia State Route 15 and Georgia State Route 121, which runs north–south through Bristol, and Georgia State Route 32, which runs east–west. Bristol is also known as Lightsey.

It was first listed as a CDP in the 2020 census with a population of 122.

History
A variant name was "Lightsey". The Georgia General Assembly incorporated Bristol as a town in 1914. According to tradition, the present name is after Bristol, in England. Bristol's charter was dissolved in 1995.

Demographics

2020 census

Note: the US Census treats Hispanic/Latino as an ethnic category. This table excludes Latinos from the racial categories and assigns them to a separate category. Hispanics/Latinos can be of any race.

References

Former municipalities in Georgia (U.S. state)
Census-designated places in Pierce County, Georgia
Waycross, Georgia micropolitan area
Populated places disestablished in 1995